Grevillea prasina is a species of flowering plant in the family Proteaceae and is endemic to north-western Australia. It is a spreading or straggly shrub with egg-shaped to elliptic leaves with coarsely-toothed edges, and dense, cream-coloured to pale yellow flowers, the style pale green to white.

Description

TaxonomyGrevillea prasina was first formally described in 1986 by Donald McGillivray in his book New Names in Grevillea (Proteaceae) from specimens collected by Rayden Alfred Perryon " W/N.W. of Wave Hill Police Station" in 1949. The specific epithet (prasina'') means "leek green".

Distribution and habitat
This grevillea grows in open woodland or shrubland between the Pentecost River in the Kimberley region of Western Australia to Port Keats in the Northern Territory, with a few scattered populations as far east as the Gulf of Carpentaria.

See also
 List of Grevillea species

References

prasina
Proteales of Australia
Eudicots of Western Australia
Taxa named by Donald McGillivray
Plants described in 1986